Ungsumalynn Sirapatsakmetha (born 13 July 1991), nickname Pattie, is a Thai film and television actress and model. She has starred in many films and television series such as Hormones (2008), Bangkok Traffic (Love) Story (2009), Hormones: The Series (2013–2014), Princess Hours (2017), Fleet of Time (2019).

Early life and education
Born in Bangkok, Thailand, Pattie has one elder brother and two elder sisters. She has a Chinese ancestry.

Pattie attended primary school at Sacred Heart Convent school although she is Buddhist. During high school at Convent of the Infant Jesus, in Bangkok, her concentration was Business Chinese. Pattie was a cheerleader and class leader who enjoyed participating in extracurricular activities including sports. Her favorite sports are badminton and wakeboarding. She graduated with a Bachelor degree of Communication Arts, majoring in Digital Film Making at SAE Institute Bangkok.

Personal life
She has been in a relationship with Worrawech Danuwong whom she met since a 2009 TV series.

Filmography

Film

Television series

Awards and nominations

References

External links
 
 

1991 births
Living people
Ungsumalynn Sirapatsakmetha
Ungsumalynn Sirapatsakmetha